Anthony Nicholas Maria Wahl (7 June 1928 – 13 September 1996) was an American historian.

Born in New York to Jewish Hungarian immigrant parents, he had an academic career encompassing Harvard, Princeton and New York University, focusing on French politics, particularly those of the Fifth French Republic, and on the political career of Charles de Gaulle.

He married Sandy Walcott in 1964, but their marriage was dissolved in 1988. The same year, he married British artist Charlotte Johnson, the former wife of Stanley Johnson, and the daughter of Sir James Fawcett; through her, he was the stepfather of Boris, Rachel and Jo and Leo Johnson.

He died of cancer in London, at the age of 68.

References

External links 
 Nicholas Wahl Papers at New York University Archives

1928 births
1996 deaths
20th-century American historians
American male non-fiction writers
American people of Hungarian-Jewish descent
Jewish American historians
Harvard University alumni
Harvard University faculty
New York University faculty
Princeton University faculty
20th-century American male writers